Iwona Buczkowska (born 1953) is a Polish-born French architect and urban planner.

She studied at the Polytechnic School in Gdańsk and the École Spéciale d'Architecture in Paris. Buczkowska received the Gold Medal and Special Prize at the Fifth World Biennale of Architecture at Sofia in 1989 for her project at Le Blanc-Mesnil and the silver medal and the Prix Delarue in 1994 from the Académie d'architecture for her collected work. In 2003, she received the Prix grand public de l’Architecture from the region Ile-de-France for her work at Le Blanc-Mesnil.

She has been inspired by the theories of French architect and urban planner Jean Renaudie, as well as the way that towns were planned in the Middle Ages, the Renaissance and the Baroque period. Buczkowska is opposed to the segregation imposed by urban zoning and to the functional urban layout proposed by the Athens Charter. She was innovative in her use of wood as a building material and advocates the use of free plan construction which facilitates movement through the building.

References

External links 
 

1953 births
Living people
French urban planners
Women urban planners
French women architects
Polish women architects
20th-century French architects
21st-century French architects
Polish emigrants to France
École Spéciale d'Architecture alumni
20th-century French women
21st-century French women